Cindy Magalí Novoa Díaz (born 10 August 1995) is a Peruvian footballer who plays as a centre back for Universitario De Deportes and the Peru women's national team.

Early life

Novoa was raised in Achamal, Amazonas.

International career
Novoa represented Peru at the 2014 South American U-20 Women's Championship. At senior level, she played the 2014 Copa América Femenina and the 2019 Pan American Games.

References

1995 births
Living people
People from Amazonas Region
Peruvian women's footballers
Women's association football central defenders
Club Universitario de Deportes footballers
Peru women's international footballers
Pan American Games competitors for Peru
Footballers at the 2019 Pan American Games
Peruvian expatriate footballers
Peruvian expatriate sportspeople in Ecuador
Expatriate women's footballers in Ecuador